Restaurant Kokkeriet is a Danish Michelin starred restaurant located on Kronprinsessegade in central Copenhagen. The kitchen is managed by chef David Johansen. Kokkeriet is owned by Sammy and Mikkel Shafi and is a family-run business managed on a daily basis by Sammy.

References

External links 
Restaurant Kokkeriet - Official Homepage

Michelin Guide starred restaurants in Denmark
Restaurants in Copenhagen
Companies based in Copenhagen Municipality